A loner is a person who does not actively seek, avoids, or is isolated from human interaction.

Loner(s) or The Loner(s) may also refer to:

Film and television
The Loners (1972 film), an American film
 The Loner (film), a 1988 American TV film directed by Abel Ferrara
Loners (2000 film), a Czech comedy film
Loner (film), a 2008 South Korean horror film
The Loners (2009 film), an Israeli film
Loners (2019 film), an American film 
The Loner (TV series), a 1960s American western TV series 1965 to 1966
 Loner (The Secret Circle), an episode of the television series The Secret Circle

Books
The Loner (children's novel), a 1963 adolescent novel by Ester Wier
The Loner (Jardine novel), a 2011 crime thriller novel by Quintin Jardine
Loner (novel), a 2016 novel by Teddy Wayne
Loners (comics), a Marvel Comics series
Loners: the Life Path of Unusual Children, a 1995 book by Sula Wolff

Music
The Loner (Maurice Gibb album), recorded in 1969 and 1970, but never released
 The Loner (Vic Simms album), 1973
 Loner (Missio album), 2017
 Loner (Alison Wonderland album), 2022
 Loner (EP), a 2014 EP by Stacy DuPree King, Darren King, and Jeremy Larson
 Loner, a 2018 album by Caroline Rose
 "The Loner" (Neil Young song), 1968
 "The Loner" (Maurice Gibb song), 1972
"The Loner", a 1979 rock song on the album Over the Top by Cozy Powell
 "Loner" (Black Sabbath song), 2013

Organizations
 Loners Motorcycle Club, an outlaw motorcycle club in Canada